Romeo Ștefan Gontineac (born 18 December 1973 in Hlipiceni, Botoşani) is a Romanian rugby union coach and former player who played as a centre. He currently coaches Aurillac.

Gontineac played for Universitatea Cluj (1993–96) in Romania, South Western Districts (1996), in South Africa. He moved to France, where he played for FC Grenoble (1996–97), Section Paloise (1997–98) and Aurillac (1998–2010), where he finished his playing career.

Gontineac has 76 caps for Romania, with 13 tries scored, 68 points in aggregate. He played all the matches for Romania in four Rugby World Cup finals, in 1995, 1999, 2003 and 2007. He also captained his country on several occasions.

In May 2010, he was appointed as head coach of the Romanian national team replacing Serge Lairle of France. Gontineac called upon the services of former All Blacks Steve McDowall to be his assistant coach in the qualifyings for the 2011 Rugby World Cup. Romania qualified but disappointed at the finals, being unable to win a single match for the first time since 1995.

His son Taylor is also a professional rugby union player.

References

External links
Romeo Gontineac International Statistics

1973 births
Living people
Romanian rugby union players
Romanian rugby union coaches
Rugby union centres
CS Universitatea Cluj-Napoca (rugby union) players
SWD Eagles players
FC Grenoble players
Section Paloise players
Stade Aurillacois Cantal Auvergne players
Romania international rugby union players
Romanian expatriate rugby union players
Expatriate rugby union players in France
Expatriate rugby union players in South Africa
Romanian expatriate sportspeople in France
Romanian expatriate sportspeople in South Africa
Romania national rugby union team coaches